TEG may refer to:

 Triethylene glycol
 Thromboelastography
 TEG (board game), an Argentine Risk-based board game
 Tenés Empanadas Graciela, a computer game inspired by the above board game
 TEG Federal Credit Union, a New York bank
 Thermoelectric generator, a device that can convert heat into electricity
 The Edrington Group, A Scotch Whisky and spirits manufacturer based in Scotland
 Teg, Umeå, a section of the city of Umeå, in Sweden
 The Teg, a small stream in Berkshire, England